Stephensia integra is a moth in the family Elachistidae. It was described by Mark I. Falkovitsh in 1986. It is found in Uzbekistan.

References

Moths described in 1986
Elachistidae
Moths of Asia